Alessandro Giorgi (born 28 October 1993) is a Grand Prix motorcycle racer from Italy.

Career statistics

By season

Races by year
(key)

References

External links
 Profile on motogp.com

Italian motorcycle racers
Living people
1993 births
125cc World Championship riders
Sportspeople from the Province of Rimini